"You Can't Sit Down" was originally recorded in 1959 as "Can't Sit Down" by The Bim Bam Boos on Dasher Records catalogue number D-500 and credited to Dasher - Muldrow; it featured Philip Upchurch on guitar and Cornell Muldrow on organ.

Background
The song references "South Street", which is the same good-time area the Orlons sang about in their 1963 recording of the same name. The Orlons and the Dovells, who later recorded the most popular version, were both from Philadelphia, and recorded for Cameo-Parkway Records.

Other versions
The later better-known recording of "You Can't Sit Down" by Phil Upchurch and his Combo (Upchurch, Muldrow, David Brooks, Mac Johnson and Joe Haddick) was re-recorded in New Orleans in 1960 and released in 1961 by Boyd Records (Boyd 3398) of Oklahoma with distribution by United Artists Records. Upchurch's own version reached No.29 on the Billboard pop charts. 
This was followed by the vocal cover version by the Dovells that reached No.3 on the Billboard Pop Singles chart in 1963. It is based, at least in part, on the gospel song "Sit Down Servant". This version also reached No.10 on the Hot R&B Singles chart
In 1962, it appeared as a cover on Booker T. and the MG's first album, Green Onions. 
The Bar Kays and Hound Dog Taylor have recorded it (on albums Soul Finger and Natural Boogie). 
In 1964, the Kingsmen included it on their LP The Kingsmen in Person. 
The Shangri-Las recorded it for their 1965 debut album.
Paul Revere & the Raiders had the track on their 1965 album Here They Come!. 
Bruce Springsteen and the E Street Band have played it live as an encore over thirty times since 1976.

Usage in media
The song was set to two Disney cartoons on D-TV, The Hockey Champ and Hockey Homicide. 
The Philadelphia 76ers used a modified version of the song with team-specific lyrics for the franchise's marketing campaign during the 1991–92 season.

References 

1959 songs
1963 singles
1960s instrumentals
Songs with lyrics by Kal Mann
The Kingsmen songs
The Shangri-Las songs
Cameo-Parkway Records singles
Songs written by Dee Clark